Michelle Goldberg (born 1975) is an American journalist and author, and an op-ed columnist for The New York Times. She has been a senior correspondent for The American Prospect, a columnist for The Daily Beast and Slate, and a senior writer for The Nation. Her books are Kingdom Coming: The Rise of Christian Nationalism (2006), The Means of Reproduction: Sex, Power, and the Future of the World (2009), and The Goddess Pose: The Audacious Life of Indra Devi, the Woman Who Helped Bring Yoga to the West (2015).

Early life and education
Goldberg was born in Buffalo, New York, the daughter of Carolyn and Gerald Goldberg. Her father was managing editor of The Buffalo News and her mother was a math professor at Niagara County Community College. Goldberg received a Bachelor of Arts degree at the State University of New York at Buffalo. She also holds a Master of Science degree in journalism from the University of California Berkeley Graduate School of Journalism. 

From her early teens she was active in the abortion rights cause, escorting a pregnant 13-year-old friend to an abortion clinic when she herself was 13 and participating in protests and abortion-clinic defense as a high-school senior. 

In an opinion column titled, "Rant for Choice", published in the student newspaper at SUNY Buffalo in 1995, Goldberg, wrote of on-campus anti-abortion demonstrators, "spit at them. Kick them in the head." Goldberg later told the Buffalo News, "Just like someone who says, 'I'm going to kill you,' I didn't mean it literally. I didn't call the article 'A Call to Arms'."

Career
Beginning in 2002, Goldberg was for several years a senior writer for Salon. For approximately two years, through September 2015, she was senior contributing writer at The Nation.

She worked as a senior correspondent at The American Prospect and a columnist for The Daily Beast and Slate magazine. Her work has been published in The New Republic, Rolling Stone, Tablet and Glamour, and in The Guardian, The New York Times, The Washington Post, and other newspapers.

Books
Goldberg's first book, Kingdom Coming: The Rise of Christian Nationalism (2006), was a finalist for the 2007 New York Public Library's Helen Bernstein Book Award for Excellence in Journalism. In 2009, she published The Means of Reproduction: Sex, Power, and the Future of the World (2009), which is based on her own reporting about the state of women's reproductive rights across several continents, and explores what she terms the "international battle over reproductive rights."

Opinions and controversies
In 2012, Goldberg criticized a column written in USA Today by Ann Romney, wife of politician and businessman Mitt Romney. Romney wrote that there was "no crown more glorious" than the "crown of motherhood." Goldberg responded that such phrases reminded her of "pronatalist propaganda of World War II-era totalitarian regimes." Conservative media outlets criticized Goldberg for the remark; she subsequently said, "I should have realized that right-wingers were going to pretend that I was saying that Romney is akin to two of the century's most murderous tyrants. ... I'm truly sorry to have given the right a pretext for another tedious spasm of feigned outrage."

In 2013, in The Nation, Goldberg criticized the public and media reactions to a tweet by a woman who was fired for tweeting "Going to Africa. Hope I don’t get AIDS. Just kidding. I'm white!" She wrote, "Almost any of us could be vulnerable to a crowd-sourced inquisition." In a July 17, 2020, column in the New York Times headlined, "Do Progressives Have a Free Speech Problem?" Goldberg wrote, "The mass uprising following the killing of George Floyd has led to a necessary expansion of the boundaries of mainstream speech.... At the same time, a climate of punitive heretic-hunting, a recurrent feature of left-wing politics, has set in, enforced, in some cases, through workplace discipline, including firings."

In 2014, Goldberg wrote a piece for The New Yorker, titled "What is a Woman?," about the conflict between transgender women and some radical feminists. It was criticized by Jos Truitt in the Columbia Journalism Review on the basis of Goldberg's support for those feminists labelled as  "trans-exclusionary radical feminists" (or "TERFs"). 

Goldberg endorsed Democratic candidate Hillary Clinton in the 2016 U.S. presidential election.

In the September 17, 2017, issue of The New York Times Book Review, Goldberg published a critical review of Vanessa Grigoriadis's study of college rape, Blurred Lines: Rethinking Sex, Power, and Consent on Campus, which included errors that the publication later corrected. "Michelle is free to dislike my book," Grigoriadis wrote to Book Review editor Pamela Paul. "She is not free to make demonstrably false statements that not only damage my book but my reputation and credibility as a reporter." The Book Review correction read, 

Regarding the corrected review, Goldberg stated on Twitter: "Two things are true here. I made a serious error. And one of the book's major claims about its subject isn't correct." She also said that she would "give a kidney and five years of my life" to retract her errors and that "This whole thing is turning into a round robin of fuckups." According to Vanity Fair, one Times source called the incident "a significant error," while another described the fallout as "humiliating".

New York Times columnist
The New York Times named Goldberg as an opinion columnist in September 2017.

"We have entered a period of minority rule," Goldberg declared in her debut column, "Tyranny of the Minority," published September 25, 2017. Goldberg argued that the U.S. Constitution's bias toward small states in the Electoral College and U.S. Senate, along with the gerrymandering of U.S. House seats and other factors, gives the Republican Party a structural advantage in national elections, allowing it to win control of the federal government without winning the most votes nationwide. "Twice in the last 17 years, Republicans have lost the popular vote but won the presidency, and it could happen again," she warned. "[President Donald] Trump's election has revealed many dark truths about this country. One of them is: We’re a lot less democratic than we might think." Since then, many other political commentators have echoed Goldberg's critique.

Goldberg takes a sanguine view on immigration, she feels that "America is tearing itself apart as an embittered white conservative minority clings to power, terrified at being swamped by a new multiracial polyglot majority." She contends, though, that "American voters can do to white nationalists what they fear most. Show them they’re being replaced."

Goldberg was a strong critic of Donald Trump's presidency. In an October 17, 2020, column headlined "Trump’s Misogyny Might Finally Catch Up With Him", she wrote: "If Trump loses, it won’t be just because enough women recognize him as a deranged bigot, it will because he blighted too many of their lives." 

From 2018 to 2021, Goldberg appeared on the weekly podcast "The Argument," in which she and other columnists for the newspaper debated major national issues. Much of the ideological disagreement on the podcast arose between Goldberg and conservative columnist Ross Douthat, though in their final appearance together on the show in February 2021, each reflected on how the other's arguments had influenced them.

Personal life
Goldberg lives in Cobble Hill, Brooklyn, New York, with her husband, Matthew Ipcar, in "a small apartment with small kids." She is a self-described secular Jew.

Bibliography
 
 The Means of Reproduction: Sex, Power, and the Future of the World

References

External links
 
 

1975 births
Living people
Date of birth missing (living people)
Journalists from New York (state)
MSNBC people
The Nation (U.S. magazine) people
New York (state) Democrats
The New Yorker people
People from Carroll Gardens, Brooklyn
Rolling Stone people
Secular Jews
University of California, Berkeley alumni
Writers from Buffalo, New York
University at Buffalo alumni